Herman Bernard Jan Witte (18 August 1909 – 30 May 1973) was a Dutch politician of the defunct Catholic People's Party (KVP) now merged into the Christian Democratic Appeal (CDA) party and civil engineer.

Witte applied at the Delft Institute of Technology in June 1927 majoring in civil engineering and obtaining a Bachelor of Engineering degree before graduating with a Master of Engineering degree in July 1933. Witte worked as a civil servant for the Ministry of Water Management as a civil engineer at Rijkswaterstaat from July 1933 until August 1939 and as a civil servant for municipality of Bergen op Zoom as director of Public Works from August 1939 until June 1940. Witte also served in the military reserve force of the Royal Netherlands Army and was mobilized on in April 1940 before Nazi Germany invaded the Netherlands. Witte was captured following the Battle of Zeeland and was detained from May 1940 until August 1940. During the German occupation Witte was associated with members of the Dutch resistance. Following the end of World War II Queen Wilhelmina Witte was appointed as acting Mayor of Bergen op Zoom, taking office on 1 May 1945. One year later on 1 May 1946 he was made permanent Mayor. After the election of 1952 Witte was appointed as Minister of Reconstruction and Housing in the Cabinet Drees II, taking office on 2 September 1952. After the election of 1956 Witte continued in the post as the newly renamed Minister of Housing and Construction in the Cabinet Drees III, taking office on 13 October 1956. Witte served as acting Minister of Transport and Water Management from 10 October 1958 until 1 November 1958 following the resignation of Jacob Algera.

The Cabinet Drees III fell on 11 December 1958 and continued to serve in a demissionary capacity until it was replaced by the caretaker Cabinet Beel II with Witte continuing as Minister of Housing and Construction, taking office on 22 December 1958. Witte was elected as a Member of the House of Representatives after the election of 1959, taking office on 20 March 1959. Following the cabinet formation of 1959 Witte was not giving a cabinet post in the new cabinet, the Cabinet Beel II was replaced by the Cabinet De Quay on 19 May 1959 and he continued to serve in the House of Representatives as a frontbencher. In September 1959 Witte was nominated as Mayor of Eindhoven, he resigned as a Member of the House of Representatives the day he was installed as Mayor, taking office on 16 October 1959. On 14 October 1966 the Cabinet Cals fell and continued to serve in a demissionary capacity until it was replaced by the caretaker Cabinet Zijlstra with Witte taking a leave of absence as Mayor and was again appointed as Minister of Housing and Spatial Planning, taking office on 22 November 1966. Witte who had previously announced that he was only willing to serve in the caretaker Cabinet Zijlstra didn't stand for the election of 1967, the Cabinet Zijlstra was replaced by the Cabinet De Jong on 5 April 1967 and he returned as Mayor of Eindhoven the same day, serving from 5 April 1967 until 30 May 1973.

Decorations

References

External links

  Ir. H.B.J. (Herman) Witte Parlement & Politiek

1909 births
1973 deaths
Catholic People's Party politicians
Commanders of the Order of Leopold II
Delft University of Technology alumni
Deaths from brain cancer in the Netherlands
Dutch academic administrators
Dutch civil engineers
Dutch corporate directors
Dutch nonprofit directors
Dutch nonprofit executives
Dutch people of World War II
Dutch prisoners of war in World War II
Dutch Roman Catholics
Knights Grand Cross of the Order of Orange-Nassau
Knights of the Holy Sepulchre
Knights of the Order of the Netherlands Lion
Mayors of Bergen op Zoom
Mayors of Eindhoven
Members of the House of Representatives (Netherlands)
Ministers of Housing and Spatial Planning of the Netherlands
Ministers of Transport and Water Management of the Netherlands
Municipal councillors in Friesland
People from Harlingen, Netherlands
Royal Netherlands Army officers
Royal Netherlands Army personnel of World War II
World War II prisoners of war held by Germany
20th-century Dutch civil servants
20th-century Dutch educators
20th-century Dutch engineers
20th-century Dutch politicians